The 2023–24 season is the 119th season in the existence of Galatasaray and the club's 66th consecutive season in the top flight of Turkish football. In addition to the domestic league, Galatasaray will participate in this season's edition of the Turkish Cup.

Overview

Club

Board of Directors

Facilities

Kits

Supplier: Nike
Main sponsor: Sixt

Back sponsor: 
Sleeve sponsor: 

Short sponsor:
Socks sponsor:

Management team

Players

Squad information

Transfers

Contracts renewals

In

Summer

Winter

Loan in

Summer

Winter

Out

Summer

Loan out

Summer

Winter

Expenditure

Income

Net totals

Pre-season and friendlies

Pre-season

Mid-season

Competitions

Overall record

Süper Lig

Results summary

Results by round

Matches

Turkish Cup

Matches

Statistics

Appearances and goals

Goalscorers

Assists

Clean sheets

Disciplinary record

Game as captain

Injury record

Attendances

References

External links

Galatasaray S.K. (football) seasons
2023 in Istanbul
Galatasaray Sports Club 2023–24 season